Charles Maguire,  a native of County Fermanagh, was a priest in Ireland, most notably Dean of Clogher until his death in 1498: a canon of Armagh, he was the author of "The Annals of Ulster".

References

15th-century Irish Roman Catholic priests
1498 deaths
Deans of Clogher
Year of birth missing
People from County Fermanagh